Pablo Laso Biurrun (born October 13, 1967) is a Spanish professional basketball coach and former player. He was the head coach of Real Madrid for eleven seasons from 2011 to 2022, guiding them to two EuroLeague championships and six Liga ACB titles. As a player, he was a prominent point guard in Spain and Italy.

Professional playing career

Club career
Laso played 17,378 minutes (4th most) in 624 games (9th most) in the Liga ACB (the top-tier level Spanish League). He holds the ACB records for most career assists (2,896) and most career steals (1,219).

He won the 1995 edition of the Spanish Cup, and won the Most Valuable Player award of the tournament. He also won the championship of the FIBA Saporta Cup's 1996–97 season.

National team career
Laso played in 61 games with the senior Spanish national team. He played at the EuroBasket 1989, the 1994 FIBA World Championship, and the EuroBasket 1995.

Professional coaching career
In 2008, Laso led Bruesa GBC, to achieve a league promotion to the Spanish top-tier level Liga ACB

Laso led Real Madrid to win the EuroLeague championships of the 2014–15 season, and the 2017–18 season. He also led Real Madrid to win 6 Spanish League championships (2013, 2015, 2016, 2018, 2019, 2022), 5 Spanish Cups (2012, 2014, 2015, 2016, 2017, 2020), and 6 Spanish Supercups (2012, 2013, 2014, 2018, 2019, 2020).

Laso also led Real Madrid to win the championship of the 2015 edition of the FIBA Intercontinental Cup.

In July 2022, Madrid parted ways with Laso due to medical reasons. He had suffered a heart attack during the 2022 ACB Playoffs that forced him to stay in the hospital for two days. Real had consulted doctors and cardiologists who said it would be a risk for Laso's health if he continued his job as head coach.

Head coaching record

EuroLeague

|- 
| align="left" rowspan=10|Real Madrid
| align="left"|2011–12
| 16 || 12 || 4 ||  || align="center"|Eliminated in Top 16 stage
|- 
| align="left"|2012–13
| 29 || 21 || 8 ||  || align="center"|Lost in the final game
|- 
| align="left"|2013–14
| 31 || 25 || 6 ||  || align="center"|Lost in the final game
|- ! style="background:#FDE910;"
| align="left"|2014–15
| 30 || 24 || 6 ||  || align="center"|Won Euroleague Championship
|- 
| align="left"|2015–16
| 27 || 12 || 15 ||  || align="center"|Eliminated in quarterfinals
|- 
| align="left"|2016–17
| 36 || 26 || 10 ||  || align="center"|Lost in 3rd place game
|- ! style="background:#FDE910;"
| align="left"|2017–18
| 36 || 24 || 12 ||  || align="center"|Won EuroLeague Championship
|- 
| align="left"|2018–19
| 35 || 26 || 9 ||  || align="center"|Won in 3rd place game
|- 
| align="left"|2020–21
| 39 || 22 || 17 ||  || align="center"|Eliminated in quarterfinals
|- 
| align="left"|2021–22
| 31 || 21 || 10 ||  || align="center"| Lost in the final game
|-class="sortbottom"
| align="center" colspan=2|Career||310||213||97||||

Honours

As player
 Copa del Rey (Spanish Cup): (1)
 1995
 FIBA Saporta Cup: (1)
 1997

As head coach
 Liga ACB (Spanish League): (6)
 2013, 2015, 2016, 2018, 2019, 2022
 Copa del Rey (Spanish Cup): (6)
 2012, 2014, 2015, 2016, 2017, 2020
 Supercopa de España de Baloncesto (Spanish Supercup): (6) 
 2012, 2013, 2014, 2018, 2019, 2020
 EuroLeague: (2)
 2015, 2018
 FIBA Intercontinental Cup: (1)
 2015

See also
 List of EuroLeague-winning head coaches

References

External links
 Pablo Laso at acb.com 
 Pablo Laso at euroleague.net
 
 

1967 births
Living people
CB Girona players
CB Valladolid players
Baloncesto Málaga players
Liga ACB players
Point guards
Real Madrid Baloncesto players
Real Madrid basketball coaches
Saski Baskonia players
Spanish basketball coaches
EuroLeague-winning coaches
Spanish men's basketball players
Sportspeople from Vitoria-Gasteiz
Valencia Basket coaches
Basketball players from the Basque Country (autonomous community)
1994 FIBA World Championship players